Crystyle is the fifth Korean extended play (seventh overall) recorded by South Korean girl group CLC. It was released on January 17, 2017, by Cube Entertainment and distributed by CJ E&M. "Hobgoblin" was released as the lead single. To promote the EP, the group performed on several South Korean music programs, including Music Bank and Inkigayo. A music video for the title track, was also released on January 17.

The EP was a peaking at number 10 on Gaon Album Chart and at number 6 on US World Albums. The album has sold 5,769 physical copies as of February 2017.

Background and release
On December 27, 2016, CLC confirmed that they would be releasing a new album in January, with a different concept from the group's existing image. It was also stated that their new album aimed to show a more charismatic, hip-hop and chic image. On January 4, 2017, CLC released the album art for their fifth extended play titled Crystyle which would be released on January 17, 2017. On January 10, CLC released a "Goblin"-concept photo.

Single

The album's title track "Hobgoblin" is an EDM trap song written by Hyuna, Seo Jaewoo, Big Sancho and Son Youngjin, people who had previously worked the 4Minute song "Crazy". The song and its music video are set to be released simultaneously with the album.

Commercial performance 
Crystyle entered at number 10 on the Gaon Album Chart on the chart issue dated January 15–21, 2017. In its second week, the EP fell to number 40. In its third week, the EP climbed to number 28, dropping the chart the following week.

The EP sold 3,975 physical copies, placing at number 30 on the Gaon Album Chart for the month of January 2017.

In the US, the mini-album entered and peaked at number 6 on Billboard's World Albums on the week ending February 4, 2017. In its second week, the EP fell to number 10.

Track listing

Charts

Weekly charts

Monthly charts

Release history

References 

Cube Entertainment EPs
CLC (group) EPs
Korean-language EPs
2017 EPs